Jand Khanzada is a village and union council, an administrative subdivision, of Chakwal District in the Punjab Province of Pakistan, it is part of Chakwal Tehsil, and is located at 32°55'60N 73°5'60E. It literally means village of Khanzada.

References

Union councils of Chakwal District
Populated places in Chakwal District